Singapore Telecommunications Limited, commonly known as Singtel, is a Singaporean telecommunications conglomerate and one of the four major telcos operating in the country.  The company is the largest mobile network operator in Singapore with 4.1 million subscribers and through subsidiaries, has a combined mobile subscriber base of 640 million customers at the end of financial year 2017. The company was known as Telecommunications Equipment until 1995. Singtel provides ISP, IPTV (Singtel TV) and mobile phone networks and fixed line telephony services.

Singtel has expanded aggressively outside its home market and owns shares in many regional operators, including full ownership of Australia's second largest telco Optus and 32.15% of Bharti Airtel, the second largest carrier in India.

Singtel controls significant market share in Australia and Singapore, with 82% of the fixed-line market, 47% of the mobile market and 43% of the broadband market in Singapore. Singtel is also the second-largest company by market capitalisation listed on the Singapore Exchange and is majority owned by Temasek Holdings, the investment arm of the Singapore government. Singtel is an active investor in innovation companies through its Singtel Innov8 subsidiary, founded in 2011 with  start up capital.

History

1800s
1883: Singapore's phone network was operated by the Oriental Telephone and Electric Company (OTEC). The Public Telephone Exchange set up 60 telephone lines connecting local businesses of that era.

1900s
1907: OTEC was replaced by a new Central Telephone Exchange in Hill Street
1955: The Singapore Telephone Board (STB) is incorporated as a statutory board with exclusive rights to operate telephone service within Singapore. 
1974: Merger of STB and Telecommunications Authority of Singapore (TAS). Before 1974, STB was responsible for local services, while TAS provided international services.
1982: Merger of the Postal Department with Telecoms.
1992: SingTel is incorporated in March (as Telecommunications Equipment) and became a public company in October 1993.
1992: SingTel introduces the call zone service, made defunct in 1997.
1997 Singtel was compensated $1.5 billion by the Singaporean Government for early termination of its monopoly, based on projected earnings lost between 2000 and 2007 due to its loss of monopoly.

2000s
 In 2000, Singtel lost its domestic monopoly in Singapore, with the government deregulating the telecommunications industry.
2001: SingTel is awarded a 3G licence in April.
In March 2001, Singtel purchased Optus for between $7.4 billion to $8.5 billion
2003: SingTel sells 60% of Singapore Post (SingPost) in May during an IPO in an effort to focus on its core telecommunications services business.
2003: SingTel announced that it has appointed Ericsson as the vendor for its 3G network in Singapore in July.
2005: SingTel launches its commercial 3G services in February.
2007: mio TV was launched commercially on 20 July 2007 and began its services on 21 July 2007.
2007: SingTel Generation mio was launched commercially on 9 January 2007 and began its services on 21 January 2007
 2008: SingTel and Apple jointly announced that SingTel will be the first mobile operator to launch the iPhone 3G and its services to Singapore in June.
 In the month of June, SingTel becomes the title sponsor of the inaugural Singapore Grand Prix in Singapore.
 On 10 July 2009, SingTel launched the iPhone 3GS commercially in Singapore.

2011–2014

 In May 2011, SingTel announced that they will be aiming to double the size of its satellite business, with two additional launches by 2013.
 In November 2011, SingTel launched Singapore's first e-book provider, Skoob, which was available through the web, iOS or Android.
 2012: SingTel acquired mobile advertising technology company Amobee in March 2012 for $321 million.
2012:  SingTel secured broadcast rights for the 2012 Summer Olympics and provided 15 new ESPN STAR Sports channels free of charge to its mio TV Services.
 2012: Singtel was fined $300,000 for breaches of the Service Resiliency Code by the IDA.
 Since December 2012, SingTel started providing 4G LTE services across Singapore.
 Since 1 August 2013, mio TV was officially renamed SingTel TV.
 In 2013 SingTel announced the sale of its entire 30% stake in Warid Telecom (Private) Limited to Warid Telecom Pakistan LLC which took place on 15 March 2013
 In 2013 SingTel was fined $180,000 for the disruption of its mio TV service where 115,000 subscribers were affected while watching the Premier League games. The problems included screen freezing, blurred images and picture distortion that happened on 13 May 2012 from 10:15 pm. Full service quality was resumed at 12:15 am the next day.
 In late 2013, Singtel shutdown its Skoob e-book store.
 In 2014 SingTel was fined $6 million for its Bukit Panjang fire in the previous year. This is the highest fine imposed on a telco in Singapore.
 In August 2014, SingTel announced it was joining forces with five other global companies, including Google, to build a super-fast undersea data cable linking the U.S. and Japan.
 In 2014 Bharati Airtel became first telecommunication company to serve 4G internet in India.

2015–2019
 On 21 January 2015, Singtel launched its new brand identity, the first in 16 years.
 On 19 March 2015, Singtel dismissed all connections with social media agency, Gushcloud. This is after a Singapore blogger Xiaxue, exposed Gushcloud's brief to its "influencers" to execute a negative campaign on M1 and Starhub, both who are direct competitors. Singtel apologised to both companies for the campaign.
 On 7 April 2015, Singtel revealed it would be acquiring US cyber security firm Trustwave for $810 million, its largest ever acquisition outside the telecoms sector.
 On 22 April 2015, the Singtel announced plans to delist from the Australian Securities Exchange due to low trading volumes.
 In April 2015, Singtel released a new Skype and WhatsApp competitor called Wavee. It allows users to make voice and video calls and send instant messages.
 In May 2015, Singtel was issued a 'stern warning' by Infocomm Development Authority (IDA) for a negative marketing campaign against its competitors: M1 Limited and Starhub through a marketing agency, Gushcloud. Singtel was required to "ensure appropriate management oversight and control over its marketing and advertising campaigns".
 On 11 April 2017, it was reported that Synack had raised $21 million from Microsoft Ventures, Hewlett Packard Enterprise, and Singtel.
 On 18 January 2019, Singtel was listed in the Bloomberg Gender-Equality Index (GEI) for the first time in recognition of gender equality.

2020–present 

 On March 2020, Singtel announced a USD 30 million investment in a new joint venture by Singtel, Thai Telco AIS and South Korea's SK Telecom in a gaming company called Storms.
 On 1 October 2020, Singtel announced the appointment of Yuen Kuan Moon as group CEO to replace current chief Chua Sock Koong after her retirement in January 2021.
On 4 December 2020, it was announced that the Singtel and ride-hailing firm Grab consortium had been awarded a digital banking licence and would start operating in 2022.
On 10 June 2022, three employees of Amobee's email marketing division were convicted of federal crimes related to illegally spamming through hijacked IP addresses.

Network and infrastructure
Singtel's international submarine cable network provides connections from Singapore to more than 100 countries. It is a major investor in many of the world's submarine cable systems, such as South-East Asia – Middle East – Western Europe 3 Cable Network, South-East Asia – Middle East – Western Europe 4 Cable Network, APCN 2, China-US, Japan-US, Southern Cross Cable and Unity (cable system). Unity Cable Network was commissioned in March 2010.

In January 2010, Singtel announced it had signed an agreement to join a consortium to build and operate the new SJC (cable system) system (SJC). The construction of the SJC cable system started in April 2011 and became operational in June 2013. The SJC has a length of 8,900 km which could extend up to 9,700 km linking up to seven countries or territories. The SJC is connected with the Unity Cable Network and is designed to deliver the lowest latency connectivity between Asia and the US, specifically from Singapore to Los Angeles.

As of fourth quarter of 2014, Singtel Mobile's 4G outdoor coverage was at 99.41%, ranked first followed by M1's 99.04%, and Starhub's 98.85%.

Singtel signed a partnership with NETSTARS, (a Tokyo-based mobile payment technology company) in March 2019. This will allow travelers to use their home mobile wallets on Singtel's VIA network to pay digitally at stores in Japan.

Singtel's mobile network in Singapore

Key operating companies
The Singtel group of companies includes subsidiaries, associated companies, as well as shareholdings in overseas entities. Its mainstay is in the mobile phone industry, where it has a total subscription base of 638 million as of 31 March 2017:

Regional mobile subsidiaries

Mobile
 Singtel Mobile Singapore Pte Ltd – operation and provision of cellular mobile telecommunications systems and services, resale of fixed line and broadband services
Optus Mobile Pty Limited – provision of mobile phone services
Virgin Mobile (Australia) Pty Limited – provision of mobile phone services, wholly own subsidiary of Optus

ICT
 NCS – provision of information technology and consultancy services
 Alphawest – provision of information technology services
 Uecomm – provision of data communication services

Digital
 Amobee – provision of mobile advertising
 Pixable – provision of mobile photo search and aggregation services
 DataSpark – provision of big data geolocation analytics 
 Singtel Digital Media Pte Ltd (STDM) – development and management of on-line internet portal
 Singtel Idea Factory Pte Ltd – engaging in research and development, products and services development and business partnership
 Singtel Innov8 Pte Ltd – venture capital investment holding

Internet and TV
 SingNet – provision of internet access and pay television services
 Optus Broadband Pty Limited – provision of high speed residential internet service
 Optus Vision Pty Limited – provision of interactive television service
 Optus Internet Pty Limited – provision of internet services to retail customers
 Vividwireless Group Limited – provision of wireless broadband services

Associate of the group
 Singapore Post Limited – operation and provision of postal and logistics services
 Telescience Singapore Pte Ltd – sale, distribution and installation of telecommunications equipment
 Viewers Choice Pte Ltd – provision of services relating to motor vehicle rental and retail of general merchandise

Incidents

Bukit Panjang Exchange fire 

On 9 October 2013, a fire incident broke out at one of Singtel's major Internet exchanges at Bukit Panjang. The fire started at around 2 p.m. Firemen from  the Singapore Civil Defence Force (SCDF) responded to the emergency call placed at 2.16pm and extinguished the fires in 20 minutes. After SCDF had cleared the building for access at 6pm, Singtel started repairing the damaged cable infrastructure. The repairs was initially assessed to be done by 10 October 2013, 7am with 33 cables of fibre strands requiring repairs. However, the repairs was slower than expected as it was difficult to identify the affected cables as visual indicators such as colour coding on the cables were rendered unusable and 116 other fibre cables required repairs as well. Connectivity to affected customers was progressively restored as the repairs stretched into the evening.

The damage incurred extensive connectivity issues in the North Western areas of Singapore, particularly in Bukit Batok, Bukit Panjang, Bukit Timah, Choa Chu Kang, Kranji, Marsiling, Teck Whye and Woodlands. Singtel reported 100 mobile base stations were affected, disconnecting its mobile service subscribers in the area. It also reported that around 60,000 fixed broadband lines, 46,000 mioTV subscribers, and 30,000 voice lines were also affected. OpenNet also reported that 81 of its fibre cables were damaged, affecting 46,000 fibre connections downstream. Business such as StarHub, M1, DBS, OpenNet and Singapore Pools saw varying levels of disruptions to their services and operations islandwide.

The cables were reconnected on 11 October 2013. However, there were still some subscribers whose connectivity services were still disrupted as of 16 October 2013. StarHub indicated that some of the repaired OpenNet cables, which it relied on to carry its fibre internet services, were not connected properly. Likewise, Singtel reported that several cables required further rectification works. Both offered alternate connectivity solutions to the affected subscribers as a temporary measure while further work took place, with StarHub sending cable modems to its affected subscribers to connect to its then existing coaxial cable network (which could carry Internet services, and was put to an end in June 2019), and Singtel sending mobile broadband dongles. Singtel also announced compensation packages to its affected subscribers of its various services.

Singtel had set up a Board Committee of Inquiry (BCOI) to investigate the fire. Additionally, the BCOI would also benchmark current network design and contingency processes against international best practices and standards, and recommend appropriate improvements to prevent future occurrences and strengthen network resilience. Separately, IDA had launched an investigation into the fire as well. Questions were raised in the public on the infrastructure design of the telecommunications network. The fire exposed the fact that Bukit Panjang exchange was a single point of failure as connectivity services of 3 major ISPs were affected due to it, with the affected OpenNet  fibre cables affecting a wide area across the nation.

Preliminary findings realised by Singtel on 6 November 2013 indicated that the fire broke out during a maintenance work at one of the lead-in pipes located in the cable chamber. The fire was caused by an employee not following the maintenance procedures as well as the use of an unauthorised blowtorch. Maintenance protocols had since strengthened, limiting maintenance work which required heat to be applied and reinforcing training on safety requirements and operations. The BCOI report, dated 9 December 2013, was released on 17 December 2013. The report covered three main areas: fire prevention in exchanges, network reliability and resiliency, as well as public relations and communications. Singtel's board has accepted the BCOI's findings and would implement its recommendations. In Singtel's 2015 annual report, it was reported that the BCOI was satisfied that all the recommendations of the BCOI had been followed up and adequately addressed.

Singtel was later fined $6 million Singapore dollars for the fire incident, it is the largest fine for a telco company in Singapore history. National fibre broadband network builder OpenNet and CityNet - the trustee manager of a Singtel unit that owns OpenNet - have also been fined $200,000 and $300,000, respectively, for failing to comply with safety procedures and restore services promptly.

Gushcloud marketing scandal 
On 14 March 2015, Xiaxue, a Singapore-based blogger, revealed on her blog instructions from Gushcloud to its network of bloggers to post complaints about the mobile services of Singtel's rivalling mobile service providers, StarHub and M1, on social media, in a marketing effort to drive subscriptions of a new mobile service plan targeted at youths by Singtel. Along with her revelation, there were many samples of Gushcloud's bloggers taking up the offer and posting complaints up on social media services. Upon the release of the complaints, both Starhub and M1 called on IDA to investigate the matter.

Initially denying that it had issued the brief, Singtel issued an apology, of which Starhub and M1 had accepted. Singtel also terminated its employee who had worked with Gushcloud on the campaign as the employee did not adhere to Singtel's professional standards and values. At the same time, Singtel ended its relationship with Gushcloud. Vincent Ha, Gushcloud's chief executive, released an apology through the firm on the firm's use of negative messaging and yet criticising Xiaxue's expose for "doing more harm than good to our industry". Xiaxue refuted the statement, saying he was trying to divert blame and calling Gushcloud's actions as "not ethical". Several bloggers involved issued apologies on their platforms as well.

Data breach incident 
On 12 February 2020, Singtel was fined $9,000 Singapore dollars for a data breach incident involving the My Singtel mobile app, a smartphone application owned by Singtel. The incident began from Singtel encountering a technical issue during its migration to a new billing system in early 2018, resulting in the personal data of 750 mobile subscribers being exposed. Of these, 39 subscribers' personal data were in fact accessed by other subscribers over a period of about 11 hours.

Assistant manager leaking client data and thieving 
Pleo Sherwin Cubos was an assistant manager at Singtel earning around $5000 Singapore dollar income, he borrowed $500 Singapore dollars in January 2020 from an unlicensed moneylender after seeing an advertisement for illegal loans on Facebook ads. Cubos later obtained more loans when he couldn't resolve his debt problems, his debt also continued to increase and he was unable to pay the debt, Cubos begin to receive loan shark harassment.

Cubos' debtor, Alan, later offered Cubos to stop loan shark harassment on him if he could access Singtel's internal data system (CRM) and using the given information to find and sharing the borrower's data with Alan. Alan gave Cubos a list of identity card numbers and phone numbers of his borrower for Cubos to find the client's data in the CRM. Between 20 February 2020 to 25 April 2020, Cubos unauthorized screenshotted 27 client's data on the CRM and sent 6 client's data to Alan.

In March and April 2020, Cubos sold a total of 3 iPads that belong to Singtel for at least $250 Singapore dollars and spent the money on his personal expenses.

Cubos' supervisor later discovered his offences and filed a police report on 2 May 2020. Cubos was then charged and pleaded guilty to one count each of assisting a loan shark and criminal breach of trust charge on 30 December 2020. He was sentenced to imprisonment for 3 months 3 weeks and fined $30,000 Singapore dollars.

Retail consultant selling client data 
Kelvin Foo Cheek Ann was a retail consultant at the Singtel outlet in Parkway Parade. Between 2014 and July 2017, he obtained Singtel's client data from Singtel's system without authorization and sold the data to his acquaintance, Lee Cheng Yan, as requested. Lee offered him $20 Singapore dollars for each mobile number checked on the system. All clients whose data sold were later received harassment calls, messages, and strangers appearing at their homes and demanding money.

Foo took a total of $180 Singapore dollars of bribes from Lee. Foo pleaded guilty to 1 charge of corruption, 5 charges of unauthorized access to Singtel's system, and 10 charges were taken into consideration during sentencing.

Zero-day attack 
On 11 February 2021, Singtel issued a statement admitting the company was attacked by hackers using Zero-day attack which resulted in a data breach. Singtel CEO Yuen Kuan Moon issued a public apology regarding the incident, which was caused by a vulnerability in an Accellion file-sharing system used by Singtel. Accellion issued its first alert of the exploits in December 2020, Singtel then applied a series of patches provided by Accellion to resolve the vulnerability. On 23 January 2021, Accellion stated that a new vulnerability had emerged and patches previously applied in December 2020 are ineffective. Singtel immediately took its system offline since. Singtel's attempt to patch the new vulnerability in the FTA system on 30 January 2021 triggered an anomaly alert, and Accellion later informed that the system might have been breached. Singtel's investigations later confirmed the system was breached and identified 20 January 2021 as the occurrence day.

Amobee executives plead guilty to hijacking IP addresses in order to send illegal spam 
On 10 June 2022, three employees of the affiliate marketing platform Amobee pleaded guilty in federal court to hijacking Internet Protocol (IP) addresses to send unsolicited commercial email messages, commonly known as “spam.”

References

External links 

 Official website
 Singtel Global Offices
 Singtel Innov8

Telecommunications companies established in 1879
Companies listed on the Singapore Exchange
Government-owned companies of Singapore
Internet in Singapore
Internet service providers of Singapore
Mobile phone companies of Singapore
Multinational companies headquartered in Singapore
International information technology consulting firms
Singaporean brands
Telecommunications companies of Singapore
Temasek Holdings
1879 establishments in Singapore